Korhogo Department is a department of Poro Region in Savanes District, Ivory Coast. In 2021, its population was 748,393 and its seat is the settlement of Korhogo. The sub-prefectures of the department are Dassoungboho, Kanoroba, Karakoro, Kiémou, Kombolokoura, Komborodougou, Koni, Korhogo, Lataha, Nafoun, Napiéolédougou, N'Ganon, Niofoin, Sirasso, Sohouo, and Tioroniaradougou.

History
Korhogo Department was created in 1969 as one of the 24 new departments that were created to take the place of the six departments that were being abolished. It was created from territory that was formerly part of Nord Department. Using current boundaries as a reference, from 1969 to 2008 the department occupied the same territory as Poro Region.

In 1997, regions were introduced as new first-level subdivisions of Ivory Coast; as a result, all departments were converted into second-level subdivisions. Korhogo Department was included as part of Savanes Region.

Korhogo Department was divided in 2008 to create Sinématiali Department and in 2011 to create Dikodougou Department.

In 2011, districts were introduced as new first-level subdivisions of Ivory Coast. At the same time, regions were reorganised and became second-level subdivisions and all departments were converted into third-level subdivisions. At this time, Korhogo Department became part of Poro Region in Savanes District.

Korhogo Department was divided a third time in 2012, when four sub-prefectures were split-off to create M'Bengué Department.

Maps of historical boundaries

Notes

Departments of Poro Region
1969 establishments in Ivory Coast
States and territories established in 1969